Lovedolls Superstar is a 1986 low budget underground film, shot on super-8 film.

It is the direct sequel to 1984's Desperate Teenage Lovedolls. It was made on a budget of approximately $10,000. The film was reissued on DVD in 2006 as Lovedolls Superstar Fully Realized (a certified directors cut).

Steven Pulchaski of Shock Cinema Magazine described the film as "one of the greatest music industry movies of the last decade".

Plot
The Lovedolls return from their untimely demise in this sequel to the Super-8 film Desperate Teenage Lovedolls (1984). Patch Kelley (Janet Housden) becomes Patch Christ, the leader of an acid-damaged religious cult who rescues has-been Kitty Karryall (Jennifer Schwartz) from a boozy, wasted life. Once reunited, they recruit Sunset Boulevard hooker Alexandria "Cheetah" Axethrasher (Kim Pilkington) to replace the recently murdered Bunny Tremelo (Hilary Rubens). Rainbow Tramaine (Steve McDonald), from the Freedom School in New Mexico ventures to Hollywood to discover his twin brother Johnny has committed suicide after taking The Lovedolls to the top, as their manager.

The She Devils leader Tanya Hearst's mother, Patricia Ann Cloverfield (Tracy Lea) is back in town to even the score. Meanwhile, obsessed fanatic Carl Celery (Jeff McDonald) lives in his own world of Lovedoll worship, only to carry out an assassination of Brews Springstien (Jordan Schwartz). With special guest appearances by Vicki Peterson (Bangles), Jello Biafra (Dead Kennedys) & Sky Saxon (The Seeds).

Cast
Jennifer Schwartz as Kitty Karryall
Steven McDonald as Rainbow Tremaine
Janet Housden as Patch Kelley
Kim Pilkington as Alexandria "Cheetah" Axethrasher
Jeff McDonald as Carl Celery
Tracy Lea as Patricia Ann Cloverfield
Jordan Schwartz as Brews Springstien
Michael F. Glass
Featuring
Vicki Peterson
Sky Saxon
Jello Biafra

Soundtrack
An accompanying soundtrack was released on SST Records, with music by Redd Kross, Love Dolls (the girls in the movie singing and backed by Redd Kross),
Sonic Youth, Meat Puppets, Dead Kennedys, Gone,
Black Flag, Annette, Painted Willie, Lawndale, and Anarchy 6.

DVD release
In 2006, the film was released in extended DVD format as "Lovedolls Superstar Fully Realized".

References

External links

 We Got Power Films Soundtrack available for download

1980s musical comedy films
1986 films
1986 comedy films
Punk films
1980s English-language films